Trichodectes is a genus of louse belonging to the family Trichodectidae.

The genus was described in 1818 by Nitzsch.

The genus has cosmopolitan distribution.

Species:
 Trichodectes baculus Schömmer, 1913
 Trichodectes canis (De Geer, 1778)
 Trichodectes carnivorus Springholz-Schmidt, 1935
 Trichodectes emersoni Hopkins, 1960
 Trichodectes ermineae (Hopkins, 1941)
 Trichodectes euarctidos Hopkins, 1954
 Trichodectes galictidis Werneck, 1934
 Trichodectes kuntzi Emerson, 1964
 Trichodectes melis (Fabricius, 1805)
 Trichodectes mustelae (Schrank, 1803)
 Trichodectes pinguis Burmeister, 1838
 Trichodectes tigris Ponton, 1870
 Trichodectes vosseleri Stobbe, 1913

References

Lice